10988 Feinstein, provisional designation , is a stony Phocaea asteroid from the inner regions of the asteroid belt, approximately 3.4 kilometers in diameter. It was discovered on 28 July 1968, by astronomers at the Félix Aguilar Observatory in El Leoncito, Argentina. The asteroid was named after Argentine astronomer Alejandro Feinstein in 2008.

Orbit and classification 

Dynamically, Feinstein is a member of the Phocaea family, a large inner-belt asteroid family of stony composition. However, no membership to any known family could be found when using the Hierarchical Clustering Method.

Feinstein orbits the Sun in the inner main-belt at a distance of 1.7–2.9 AU once every 3 years and 5 months (1,257 days). Its orbit has an eccentricity of 0.26 and an inclination of 24° with respect to the ecliptic. The body's observation arc begins at El Leoncito with its official discovery observation in 1968.

Physical characteristics 

Feinstein has been characterized as a common stony S-type asteroid by PanSTARRS photometric survey, which agrees with the family's overall spectral type.

Rotation period 

In May 2016, a rotational lightcurve of Feinstein was obtained from photometric observations by Czech astronomer Petr Pravec at Ondřejov Observatory. Lightcurve analysis gave a short rotation period of 2.6723 hours with a brightness amplitude of 0.11 magnitude.

Diameter and albedo 

The Collaborative Asteroid Lightcurve Link assumes an albedo of 0.23 – derived from 25 Phocaea, the Phocaea family's largest member and namesake – and calculates a mean-diameter of 3.43 kilometers based on an absolute magnitude of 14.54.

Naming 

This minor planet was named after Argentinian astronomer Alejandro Feinstein (born 1928) at La Plata Astronomical Observatory in La Plata, and one of the co-founders of the Argentinian Astronomical Association. The official naming citation was published by the Minor Planet Center on 20 May 2008.

Notes

References

External links 
 Asteroid Lightcurve Database (LCDB), query form (info )
 Dictionary of Minor Planet Names, Google books
 Asteroids and comets rotation curves, CdR – Observatoire de Genève, Raoul Behrend
 Discovery Circumstances: Numbered Minor Planets (10001)-(15000) – Minor Planet Center
 
 

010988
010988
Named minor planets
19680728